Ernő Kis-Király born March 26, 1958 in  Komló, Hungary, (father: Kálmán Kis-Király miner; mother: Lenke Handó an employee of the Hungarian State Railways) is a Hungarian ultramarathon runner .

Kis-Király is most well known for his three victories at the Vienna to Budapest Supermarathon five-day stage race, the most prestigious road race in Central Europe of the 1990s. At the same time, his sub 6:30 hour mark at the 100 km (De Nacht van Vlaanderen 1989) event and his 12-hour performance exceeding 150 km (1991) are just as remarkable.

Clubs and coaches 

Kis-Kiraly's athletic career started in the local miners’ soccer club called Komlói Bányász in 1968 from which, being a promising middle and long distance track runner, he transferred to track and field. During his mandatory army service he trained in Kiskunfélegyháza and Budapest. Between 1992 and 1995 he competed for Pile Sports Club as a semi-professional long-distance runner. He was coached by Sándor Fogarasi (Komlói Bányász) 1973-74; István Dudás (Komlói Bányász) 1975-77; József Babinyecz (Kiskunfélegyházi Honvéd) 1977-79; and István Gonda BVSC 1985-86.  From 1987 on he was his own coach.

Ultramarathon highlights 
 
The highlights of his ultramarathon career include his European Cup victory achieved in Hirtenberg, Austria in 1985, his victory earned with a distance of 150,838 km, in the 12-hour event in Szeged, Hungary in 1987, and his European Championship title in the 12-hour event in  Moreuil, France in 1991.

Wins in additional ultramarathon events and stage races include feats such as the 61 km run from Zagreb to Cazma, Yugoslavia (1984) or Austria Cross (749 km in 7 days) and the Race Across the Sahara Desert in 13 stages in Algeria in 1986. Also in 1986, Kis-Király was the runner-up behind Yiannis Kouros in the gruelling Spartathlon race from Athens to Sparta.

Work in the mines 

Besides representing Hungary as a member of the Hungarian National Track and Field Team and the Association of Hungarian Ultra-runners, Kis-Király worked as locksmith in the mines of Komló between 1979 and 1983 (See Török, 1993). Due to his criticism of the regime he was  deprived of his passport in the early 1980s.

The editor of the German professional magazine Condition featured Kis-Király as one of the best prepared and most relaxed runners in the field. In his book on extreme sports, Didier Braun devotes three pages to Kis-Király (Braun 1989).

Massage therapy and landscape design 

Besides running, Kis-Király is also an expert in sports massage therapy, gerontological nursing and landscape design. He is not only a mentor for up-and-coming ultra-runners, but is also an avid chess player.

Personal best performances

Awards

Hungarian Ultrarunners' Hall of Fame (2016)

Sources 
 Condition. Die Zeitschift für Ausdauersport 4, 15. Jahrgang, Juli 1984
 Didier Braun; Agnès Courrault; et al. (1989): Sports extrêmes, AREION Édition, Aulogne Lés Grands Défis de L’Aventure 
 Török Ferenc: Bánya - Bécs-Budapest (1993) 
 Zsaru Magazin 45. 1993. November 4.
 Kis-Király's partial list of ultra runs in the DUV data base 

1958 births
Living people
Hungarian ultramarathon runners
Hungarian male long-distance runners
Male ultramarathon runners
People from Komló
Sportspeople from Baranya County